The Large Guild is a building in Riga, Latvia. It is located near Livonian Square on 6 Amatu Street. The Large Guild was erected in the years 1854–1859 and built in English Gothic style with Gothic forms. It is one of the oldest public buildings in the Baltic states. The building is currently used as the Latvian National Symphony Orchestra concert hall.

History 

Large Guild was Riga merchant organization. Its roots begin with Holy Spirit guild in the 13th century as Riga's first new established brotherhood. The Guild accepted traders and craftsmen, except for weavers and sauna operators. Later the Holy Spirit guild was split in two parts. According to historical sources, the two parts were named for the two rooms: the Minster and Zoste Rooms. The two room names were brought from Germany by German traders. Later on, the two guild organizations were split by economic and social interests: the Large Guild brought together German traders and the Small Guild brought together German craftsmen. In 1353, in the Minster Room, traders were recognized by statute, and that it is treated as the year of Large Guild establishment.

The current look of the Large Guild was made by architects Karl Beine and Heinrich Shelle between 1853 and 1859. Large Guild was rebuilt in the Tudor gothic style. The concert hall in the Guild was made after 1963 because of a fire.

In 1965. the Guild was reconstructed by architect Modris Gelz and the interior was customized for concert hall needs.

The Large Guild currently houses the Latvian National Symphony Orchestra. Its rooms are also suitable for a wide range of cultural events and conferences.

Interior 

The most known Large Guild rooms are the minster room and bride's chamber. The minster room is famous because it is the only room in Latvia who is preserved from the Middle Ages as a secular society building indoor room. The bride's chamber was meant as a Guild gathering place and also was meant for wedding needs.

In 1888 there was made stained glass in the Large guilds staircase (master A. Frieshtatle), expressing the greatness of united German merchants. Stained glass depicts the events of 1353, when the master of the Order of the city handed over Large guilds building to the representatives of the guild.

Modern day stained glass depicts most important business areas of Riga. In 1936, stained glass was made by Ansis Cīrulis.

References 

Commercial buildings completed in 1857
Buildings and structures in Riga
Large Guild
1857 establishments in the Russian Empire